"Primitive Love Rites" is a song by Australian rock band Mondo Rock, released in October 1986  as the second single from the band's fifth studio album Boom Baby Boom (1986). The song peaked at number 34 on the Kent Music Report. The song became the band's only song to peak within the Billboard Hot 100, at 71. In New Zealand the song peaked at number 40 on Recorded Music NZ.

Track listings 
Aus 7" Single 

Aus 12" Single 

 International 12" single

Charts

Personnel 
 Ross Wilson – vocals, guitar, harmonica (1976–1991)
 John James Hackett – drums, percussion, guitar (1981–1990)
 James Gillard – bass guitar (1982–1990)
 Andrew Ross – saxophone, keyboards (1986–1990)
 Eric McCusker – guitar, keyboards (1980–1991)
 Duncan Veall – keyboards (1984–1990)

References

Mondo Rock songs
1986 singles
1986 songs
Songs written by Ross Wilson (musician)
Polydor Records singles